Walter Kirk Stratton Jr. (born August 2, 1950) is an American film and television actor born in Front Royal, Virginia. He portrayed Lt. Lawrence Casey in the American television series Black Sheep Squadron . Stratton also played the recurring role of Cmdr. Ted Lindsey in 14 episodes of the American legal drama television series JAG.

Stratton played the role of Lawrence "Larry" Stanton III in three episodes of the science fiction television series Quantum Leap from 1992. He also starred in the comedy-drama television series Tequila and Bonetti. Stratton guest-starred in television programs including The Love Boat; The Rockford Files; Airwolf; The Incredible Hulk; The A-Team; Battlestar Galactica; The Rookies; Murder, She Wrote; Tales of the Gold Monkey; Magnum, P.I.; Lou Grant and Hill Street Blues. He also appeared in a few films.

Television

References

External links 

Rotten Tomatoes profile

1950 births
20th-century American male actors
21st-century American male actors
American male film actors
American male television actors
Living people
Male actors from Virginia
People from Front Royal, Virginia